Sir James Martin Lloyd, 1st Baronet (21 May 1762 – 24 October 1844)  was a Sussex landowner, militia officer and long-serving Member of Parliament, who was created a baronet but left no son to inherit the title.

Family and education
Lloyd was born on 21 May 1762, the only son of James Lloyd of Lancing, Sussex and his wife Elizabeth, daughter of Reverend Edward Martin. He was educated at University College, Oxford. He was first married on 20 Jan 1785 to Rebecca, daughter of Reverend William Green, who died on 7 February 1812. They had three daughters, of whom only one survived him. On 10 Nov 1812, he married Elizabeth Anne, daughter of Reverend Colston Carr and sister of Bishop Robert Carr.

Career
He served in the Sussex Militia, becoming a major in 1783 and lieutenant-colonel in 1803. 

In 1790 and 1791 he was elected MP for Steyning, but was forced on both occasions to stand down on petition. He regained the seat in 1796, holding it until 1818 with a short break in 1806, during which time he briefly held the office of Clerk of Deliveries of the Ordnance. In 1818 he was offered the neighbouring constituency of New Shoreham for which he sat until 1826. He was created a baronet on 30 Sep 1831.

Legacy
In 1827 he had bought the manor of Lancing, where his family had owned land since the early eighteenth century, and by 1834 owned four-fifths of the parish. When he died on 24 October 1844, his unmarried daughter Rebecca was his heiress but she died in December 1846. His widow Elizabeth then became heiress and when she died on 4 August 1858 she left the estate to her nephew George Kirwan Carr Lloyd.

References

John Burke, A General and Heraldic Dictionary of the Peerage and Baronetage, Volume 2 (London, 1833)
A P Baggs, C R J Currie, C R Elrington, S M Keeling and A M Rowland, 'Lancing', in A History of the County of Sussex: Volume 6 Part 1, Bramber Rape (Southern Part), ed. T P Hudson (London, 1980), pp. 34–53 http://www.british-history.ac.uk/vch/sussex/vol6/pt1/pp34-53 [accessed 9 September 2015].

1762 births
1844 deaths
People from Lancing, West Sussex
Alumni of University College, Oxford
English landowners
Members of the Parliament of Great Britain for English constituencies
British MPs 1790–1796
British MPs 1796–1800
Members of the Parliament of the United Kingdom for English constituencies
UK MPs 1801–1802
UK MPs 1802–1806
UK MPs 1806–1807
UK MPs 1807–1812
UK MPs 1812–1818
UK MPs 1818–1820
UK MPs 1820–1826
Baronets in the Baronetage of the United Kingdom
People from Steyning